The Ashok Leyland MiTR is a Minibus manufactured by Ashok Leyland in Joint venture with Nissan. The vehicle was unveiled in January 2014 during the 12th Auto Expo 2014 and was launched in July 2014.

Variants
Ashok Leyland MiTR comes in one variant.

Specifications
Ashok Leyland MiTR
Seating capacity: 28 (including driver)
Displacement: 2,953 cm3
Max Engine power: 116.67 Bhp
Max Torque:  @ 2,400 rpm
Engine: ZD30 DDTi Common rail, BS III
Fuel: Diesel

See also
Ashok Leyland

References 

Cars of India
MiTR
Vehicles introduced in 2014